In number theory, Tunnell's theorem gives a partial resolution to the congruent number problem, and under the Birch and Swinnerton-Dyer conjecture, a full resolution.

Congruent number problem

The congruent number problem asks which positive integers can be the area of a right triangle with all three sides rational.  Tunnell's theorem relates this to the number of integral solutions of a few fairly simple Diophantine equations.

Theorem
For a given square-free integer n, define

Tunnell's theorem states that supposing n is a congruent number, if n is odd then 2An = Bn and if n is even then 2Cn = Dn.  Conversely, if the Birch and Swinnerton-Dyer conjecture holds true for elliptic curves of the form , these equalities are sufficient to conclude that n is a congruent number.

History

Importance
The importance of Tunnell's theorem is that the criterion it gives is testable by a finite calculation.  For instance, for a given , the numbers  can be calculated by exhaustively searching through  in the range .

See also
Birch and Swinnerton-Dyer conjecture
Congruent number

References
 
 

Theorems in number theory
Diophantine equations